Leïla Bahira (died 20 April 2021) was a Tunisian politician and judge. She served as Secretary of State to Tunisian Minister of Foreign Affairs Othman Jerandi, overseeing African and Arab affairs from 2013 to 2014.

References

2021 deaths
21st-century Tunisian politicians
21st-century Tunisian women politicians
Tunisian judges
Women judges